Gerberding is a surname. Notable people by that name include:

 Julie Gerberding (born 1955), American infectious disease expert.
 William P. Gerberding (1929–2014), American educator. 
 Richard Gerberding, professor emeritus University of Alabama.
 Erich Gerberding (1921–1986), German actor.